RING finger protein 31 is a protein that in humans is encoded by the RNF31 gene.

The protein encoded by this gene contains a RING finger, a motif present in a variety of functionally distinct proteins and known to be involved in protein-DNA and protein-protein interactions.

See also
 RING finger domain

References

Further reading

External links 
 

RING finger proteins